Inventions That Changed the World is a five-part BBC Two documentary series presented by Jeremy Clarkson. First broadcast on 15 January 2004, the programme takes a look at some of the inventions that helped to shape the modern world. The UKTV channel Yesterday frequently repeats this series.  However, episodes are edited to 46 minutes to allow for commercials to air in the one-hour time slot.

Episodes

See also
 Inventions of America
 Inventions of the Islamic Golden Age

External links

BBC Press Release

2004 British television series debuts
2004 British television series endings
BBC television documentaries about history
BBC television documentaries about science
Documentary films about technology
Documentary films about the history of science
History of computing in the United Kingdom
Inventions